Jayajirao Scindia GCB, GCSI, CIE (19 January 1834 – 20 June 1886) of the Scindia dynasty of the Marathas was the ruling Maharaja of Gwalior under the British rule from 1843 to 1886.

Early life

Jayajirao was born as Bhagirath Shinde, son of Hanwant Rao on 19 January 1835. The erstwhile Maharaja of Gwalior, Jankojirao II, died in 1843 without leaving an heir leading his widow Tara Bai to adopt Bhagirath Rao. Bhagirath Shinde succeeded the Gwalior gaddi under the name of Jayajirao Sindhia on 22 February 1843. Mama Sahib, the maternal uncle of Jankojirao III, was chosen as regent.

Early reign and campaigns against the British

Dada Khasgiwale, the comptroller of the Shinde household overthrew Mama Sahib as the regent nearly leading to a civil war. The British East India Company decided to interfere by withdrawing their Resident Colonel Alexander Speirs and demanding the surrender of Dada Khasgiwale was demanded. A British force under Sir Hugh Gough moved on Gwalior, and crossed the Chambal in December 1843. On 29 December followed the simultaneous battles of Maharajpur and Panniar, in which the Gwalior army was annihilated. Khasgiwale was arrested by the British and was sent to Benares Jail where he died in 1845.

A treaty was then made, under which certain lands to the value of 1.8 million, including Chanderi District, were ceded for the upkeep of a contingent force, besides other lands for the liquidation of the expenses incurred in the war, the State army was reduced, and a Council of Regency was appointed during the minority, to act under the resident's advice.

When in 1857, the Indian rebellion against the British began, Jayajirao, whose ancestors had fought and been defeated by them, was known as a good friend of the British. However, his minister, Dinkar Rao, along with Major Chartres Macpherson, the British representative to Gwalior, convinced him to initially stay neutral and later to side with the British, despite unrest amongst his troops and his people who wanted to join the rebels.

On 1 June 1858, Jayajirao led his forces to Morar to fight a rebel army led by Tatya Tope, Rani Lakshmibai and Rao Sahib. This army had 7,000 infantry, 4,000 cavalry and 12 guns while he had only 1,500 cavalry, his bodyguard of 600 men and 8 guns. He waited for their attack which came at 7 o'clock in the morning; in this attack the rebel cavalry took the guns and most of the Gwalior forces except the bodyguard went over to the rebels. Jayajirao and the remainder fled without stopping until they reached Agra.

Development work

In 1872, Jayajirao lent Rs. 7.5 million for the construction of the Agra-Gwalior portion of the Great Indian Peninsular Railway, and a similar amount in 1873 for the Indore-Neemuch section of the Rajputana-Malwa railway. In 1882 land was ceded by the state for the Midland section of the Great Indian Peninsular Railway.

Jayaajirao constructed many new buildings like Moti Mahal, Jai Vilas Palace, Kampoo Kothi, Victoriya Building, Gorkhi Dwar Gate and Daffrine Sarai. He reconstructed the Koteshwar Mandir and constructed about 69 Shiva temples across his state. He gave Rs. 1.5 million for the reconstruction of Gwalior fort's boundary wall and the broken parts of Man Mandir, Gujri Mahal and Johar Kund. In 1886 Gwalior fort and Morar cantonment, with some other villages, which had been held by British troops since 1858, were exchanged for Jhansi city.

Honours
In 1861, Jayajirao was created a Knights Grand Commander of the Order of the Star of India. His photos appeared in the London press and was regarded as the friend of the British Empire. In 1877, he became a Counsellor of the Empress and later on a GCB and CIE.

Family
Jayajirao married Chimnabai Kadam in 1843 and Laxmibai Gujar in 1852. Balwantrao Shinde was his eldest son from Laxmibai. Jayajirao married his third wife Babuibai Sawant in 1873 and fourth wife Sakhyabai. Jayajirao and Sakhyabai had a son, his fourth but only surviving son, named Madho Rao (b. 1876) who succeeded him as ruler of Gwalior. One of his sons was Shrimant Ganpat Rao, who died in 1920.
 

Ganpat Rao was a famous musician who trained Jaddanbai, mother of actress Nargis.

Death

Jayajirao Scindia died in June 1886 at Jai Vilas Mahal, Gwalior.

Full name and titles
His official full name was also General His Highness Ali Jah, Umdat ul-Umara, Hisam us-Sultanat, Mukhtar ul-Mulk, Azim ul-Iqtidar, Rafi-us-Shan, Wala Shikoh, Muhtasham-i-Dauran, Maharajadhiraj Maharaja Shrimant Sir Jayaji Rao Scindia Bahadur, Shrinath, Mansur-i-Zaman, Fidvi-i-Hazrat-i-Malika-i-Mua'zzama-i-Rafi-ud-Darja-i-Inglistan Maharaja Scindia of Gwalior', GCB, GCSI, CIE

1835–1843: Shrimant Kumar Bhagirath Rao Scindia
1843–1845: His Highness Ali Jah, Umdat ul-Umara, Hisam us-Sultanat, Mukhtar ul-Mulk, Maharajadhiraj Maharaja Shrimant Jayajirao Scindia Bahadur, Shrinath, Mansur-i-Zaman, Maharaja Scindia of Gwalior
1845–1861: His Highness Ali Jah, Umdat ul-Umara, Hisam us-Sultanat, Mukhtar ul-Mulk, Azim ul-Iqtidar, Rafi-us-Shan, Wala Shikoh, Muhtasham-i-Dauran, Maharajadhiraj Maharaja Shrimant Jayajirao Scindia Bahadur, Shrinath, Mansur-i-Zaman, Fidvi-i-Hazrat-i-Malika-i-Mua'zzama-i-Rafi-ud-Darja-i-Inglistan Maharaja Scindia of Gwalior
1861–1866: His Highness Ali Jah, Umdat ul-Umara, Hisam us-Sultanat, Mukhtar ul-Mulk, Azim ul-Iqtidar, Rafi-us-Shan, Wala Shikoh, Muhtasham-i-Dauran, Maharajadhiraj Maharaja Shrimant Sir Jayajirao Scindia Bahadur, Shrinath, Mansur-i-Zaman, Fidvi-i-Hazrat-i-Malika-i-Mua'zzama-i-Rafi-ud-Darja-i-Inglistan Maharaja Scindia of Gwalior, KSI
1866–1877: His Highness Ali Jah, Umdat ul-Umara, Hisam us-Sultanat, Mukhtar ul-Mulk, Azim ul-Iqtidar, Rafi-us-Shan, Wala Shikoh, Muhtasham-i-Dauran, Maharajadhiraj Maharaja Shrimant Sir Jayajirao Scindia Bahadur, Shrinath, Mansur-i-Zaman, Fidvi-i-Hazrat-i-Malika-i-Mua'zzama-i-Rafi-ud-Darja-i-Inglistan Maharaja Scindia of Gwalior, GCSI
1877–1878: General His Highness Ali Jah, Umdat ul-Umara, Hisam us-Sultanat, Mukhtar ul-Mulk, Azim ul-Iqtidar, Rafi-us-Shan, Wala Shikoh, Muhtasham-i-Dauran, Maharajadhiraj Maharaja Shrimant Sir Jayajirao Scindia Bahadur, Shrinath, Mansur-i-Zaman, Fidvi-i-Hazrat-i-Malika-i-Mua'zzama-i-Rafi-ud-Darja-i-Inglistan Maharaja Scindia of Gwalior, GCB, GCSI
1878–1886: General His Highness Ali Jah, Umdat ul-Umara, Hisam us-Sultanat, Mukhtar ul-Mulk, Azim ul-Iqtidar, Rafi-us-Shan, Wala Shikoh, Muhtasham-i-Dauran, Maharajadhiraj Maharaja Shrimant Sir Jayajirao Scindia Bahadur, Shrinath, Mansur-i-Zaman, Fidvi-i-Hazrat-i-Malika-i-Mua'zzama-i-Rafi-ud-Darja-i-Inglistan Maharaja Scindia of Gwalior, GCB, GCSI, CIE

References

Further reading

External links

1835 births
1886 deaths
Knights Grand Commander of the Order of the Star of India
Jayajirao
Knights Commander of the Order of the Indian Empire
Indian knights
Honorary Knights Grand Cross of the Order of the Bath